Casco Schutzhelme based in Bretnig-Hauswalde, Germany, is a protection headwear producing company from Germany which has one production-center in Satu Mare, Romania and a distribution-centre in Bretnig-Hauswalde. The Company is specialised in producing helmets and safety glassess. Amongst famous people who used the company's protective gear are Ole Einar Bjørndalen, Lars Bystøl, Jos Lansink and Jens Fiedler.

External links 
Global site

Companies based in Saxony
Companies established in 1989
German brands
Manufacturing companies of Germany
1989 establishments in East Germany